Camden Bridge is a continuous span plate girder bridge, that spans the Mississippi River in Minneapolis.  It connects 42nd Avenue North in the Camden community on the west side of the river to 37th Avenue Northeast in Northeast Minneapolis on the east side.  It also links Webber Parkway (on the west side) to St. Anthony Parkway on the east side, completing a link in the Grand Rounds Scenic Byway.  It was built in 1977 and was designed by Jacus Associates Incorporated.

The bridge was closed in April 2010 for a six-month resurfacing project and reopened ahead of schedule on August 21, 2010.

See also
List of crossings of the Upper Mississippi River

References
 

Bridges completed in 1977
Bridges in Minneapolis
Bridges over the Mississippi River
Road bridges in Minnesota
Plate girder bridges in the United States
1977 establishments in Minnesota